Remuk castle is a historical castle located in Kerman County in Kerman Province, The longevity of this fortress dates back to the Historical periods after Islam.

References 

Castles in Iran